Peter Buch Christiansen (born 2 December 1999) is a Danish professional footballer who plays for SønderjyskE as a striker.

Career
After a good season for the SønderjyskE under-17 squad, Christiansen signed a three-year youth contract with the club. He made his senior debut on 8 December 2018, against Hobro IK, where he started on the pitch but was replaced by Rasmus Vinderslev in the 68th minute. Later hat month he signed a new three-year contract, starting after the expiry of his youth contract in summer 2019.

On 17 June 2021 Christiansen signed on loan for FC Helsingør for the 2021–22 season. The loan ended early in December 2021, due to lack of playing time at Helsingør.

Honours
SønderjyskE
Danish Cup: 2019–20

References

1999 births
Living people
Danish men's footballers
SønderjyskE Fodbold players
FC Helsingør players
Danish Superliga players
Danish 1st Division players
Association football forwards